Hong hu chi wei dui is a 1961 Chinese war film directed by Fangqian Chen. The film tells that captain Liu and secretary Han lead a group of red guards retreat from base area and fight back again.

Cast
Kuibin Xia as Chuang Liu
Ling Fu as Qiu Ju
Zengyin Cao as Colonel Feng
Jinpeng Chen as Peng 'Ba Tian'
Renxuan Chen as Hei Gu

References

External links

1961 films
1961 war films
1960s Mandarin-language films
Chinese war films
Honghu